Dancing for Victory is the second studio album of Moti Special, released in 1990 by Polydor. The band members were: the keyboardist and vocalist Frank Ådahl, guitarist Nils Tuxen, bassist Anders Mossberg, and drummer Reinhard "Dickie" Tarrach.

Track listing
«Higher in the Name of Love» — 4:18
«In Love We Stand» — 3:54
«From Your Lips to God's Ear» — 5:12
«Still the Same» — 4:12
«Shade of Grey» — 4:05
«Dancing for Victory» — 5:06
«(Let Me Call You) Angel» — 4:30
«You Can Take It All» — 3:46
«Fool in Paradise» — 4:06
«Behind Closed Doors» — 3:46
«Special Moments» — 0:36

Personnel
 Frank Ådahl —  vocalist, keyboardist
 Nils Tuxen — guitarist, producer
 Anders Mossberg — bassist
 Dicky Tarrach — drummer, producer
 Werner Becker — producer

Singles
«In Love We Stand» / «Out of Rhyme» (1989)
«Dancing for Victory» / «From Your Lips to God's Ear» (1990)
«Behind Closed Doors» (Radio Version) / «Behind Closed Doors» (Original) (1990)

References

1990 albums
Moti Special albums